The single mixed relay biathlon competition at the 2016 Winter Youth Olympics was held on 17 February at the Birkebeineren Ski Stadium.

Results
The race was started at 11:00.

References

Biathlon at the 2016 Winter Youth Olympics